Jesús District is one of seven districts of the province Lauricocha in Peru.

Geography 
The Waywash mountain range and the Rawra mountain range traverse the district. One of the highest peaks of the district is Siula. Other mountains are listed below:

See also 
 Lawriqucha River
 Qarwaqucha
 Tampuqucha
 Tikra
 Waskhaqucha

References